Mtshelele River is a tributary river of the Thuli River in Zimbabwe.

Rivers of Zimbabwe